Chantal Ughi (born 17 December 1981) is an Italian American female kickboxer, actress and multiple Muay Thai champion.

Ughi started training Muay Thai in New York aged 20, and in January 2008 left her acting career in the United States to become a full time Muay Thai fighter in Thailand. She has since spoken out about the difficulties of being a female in a sport run by men, as well as her experiences of traveling to Thailand alone as a girl to train and compete in Muay Thai. Chantal Ughi is a seven times World Champion in the sport.

In 2014, Ughi returned to Italy to resume her acting career and was the subject matter and lead actress in the 2015 documentary "Goodbye Darling I'm Off To Fight!" (original in Italian: Ciao Amore Vado a Combattere!) directed by Simone Manetti and produced by Alfredo Covelli, where she plays herself.

Filmography

Acting career

Actress, Director, Singer and photographer, Chantal studied piano and followed her family relative Uto Ughi a violin player, at an early age. She then started modeling and traveling Europe, Paris, London, Madrid and Tokyo, Japan. At the same time she pursued her passion for acting and photography.

Ughi soon moved to Rome where she got her first acting role in the movie "Traveling Companion", starring Asia Argento and French actor Michel Piccoli, (Official Selection @ the Cannes International Film Festival).

She quickly became the muse of many European film directors such as Peter Del Monte, Citto Maselli, Giuseppe Piccioni, Fulvio Ottaviano. She showcased her talent in both drama and comedy movies through many leading and supporting roles in internationally acclaimed European and Italian movies like "Not Of This World", starring Margherita Buy and Silvio Orlando (United Artists Release and winner of the Montreal World Film Festival and the AFI Los Angeles Film Festival),"Love in The Mirror" starring Peter Stormare (Dancer In The Dark), the Italian Academy Award Winner "Growing Artichocks in Mimongo, the critically acclaimed comedy "But We Only Made Love", where she plays Corinna, and "Albania Blues" where she plays Aida.

After an Intensive Shakespeare Program @ The Royal Academy of Dramatic Arts in London RADA, Chantal decided to move to New York City, where she immediately landed a leading role in the romantic comedy "Big Apple", aka "Freax and the City" which she also help produce. In New York her debut film "La Mia Mano Destra" (My Right Hand) won for Best Short @ the Brooklyn International Film Festival.

Goodbye Darling I'm Off To Fight! (Ciao Amore Vado a combattere!) directed by Simone Manetti and Produced by Alfredo Covelli, where Ughi plays herself, was won Best Italian Documentary Prize and Jury Special Mention Prize at the prestigious 2016 Biografilm Festival in Bologna, Italy as well as Best Documentary at Molise Cinema and many other prizes. It was also nominated for Italian Nastri D'Argento 2017. It was released in movie theatres all around Italy in 2017 by I Wonder Pictures.

In 2016, Chantal played the lead role in Fiorella Mannoia's music video to "Nessuna Conseguenza" (No consequences), highlighting the continued relevance of violence against women and domestic abuse.

Muay Thai Career 
Chantal Ughi began fighting Muay Thai professionally in 2008. She is a seven times World Champion in the sport. She won her first Muay World title the WPMF against Carly Giumulli on Dec. 5th 2008, during the King of Thailand's Birthday celebration in Bangkok, in front of 100.000 people. Chantal Ughi has fought Miriam Nakamoto for the WBC, Julie Kitchen for her WPMF title defense, Stephanie Ielö Page for the WMA and Eileen Forrest for the ISKA titles.

Championships and Accomplishments 
World Professional Muaythai Federation
WPMF World Welterweight Championship (147 lbs)
One title defense against Julie Kitchen
World Muaythai Association
WMA World Super Lightweight Championship (140 lbs)
World Muaythai Federation
WMF World Super Lightweight Championship (140 lbs)
WMF World Welterweight Championship (147 lbs)
WMF World Welterweight Amateur Championship (147 lbs)
World Taekwondo Kickboxing Association
WTKA World Welterweight Amateur Championship (147 lbs)
World Muaythai Organization
WMO World Super Lightweight Championship (140 lbs)
WMO Welterweight Championship (147 pounds
Muaythai Premiere League 
Runner up 63.5 kg. (140 lbs.) SuperLightweight division

Titles 
2015 - WMO World Champion 63.5 Kg.
2014 - World Muay Thai Federation(WMF) Pro Am World Champion 63.5 kg.
2014 - World Muay Thai Federation(WMF) Amateur World Champion  66 kg.
2012 – WMF Pro AM World Champion 66 kg (1 defense)
2010 – WMF World Championship (Bronze)
2009 – WMA World Champion 63.5 kg
2009 – Patong Stadium PK1 Champion (1 defense)
2008 – WMF World championship, Prince's Cup 67 kg (Gold)
2008 – WPMF World Champion 67 kg
2008 – WTKA K1 Division Amateur World Champion 67 kg
2008 – WTKA Muay Thai Division Amateur World Champion 67 kg
2008 – WKA North American Amateur Champion 67 kg

Record 

|- style="background:#fdd;"
|
| style="text-align:center;"|Loss
| Annalisa Bucci
| 
| Ancona, Italy
| style="text-align:center;"|Split Decision
|align=center|2
|align=center|3:00
| style="text-align:center;"|
|-
! style=background:white colspan=9 |
|-
|- style="background:#cfc;"
|
| style="text-align:center;"|Win
| Daniellea Callejas
| 
| 
| style="text-align:center;"|
|align=center|3
|align=center|3:00
| style="text-align:center;"|
|-
! style=background:white colspan=9 |
|- style="background:#fdd;"
|
| style="text-align:center;"|Loss
| Jorina Baars
|Lion Fight 20
| Mashantucket, Connecticut, United States
| style="text-align:center;"|TKO
|align=center|1
|align=center|2:35
| style="text-align:center;"|
|- style="background:#fdd;"
|
| style="text-align:center;"|Loss
| Miriam Nakamoto
|WCK Muay Thai
| Haikou City, Hainan Island, China
| style="text-align:center;"|Decision (unanimous)
|align=center|5
|align=center|2:00
| style="text-align:center;"|
|-
! style=background:white colspan=9 |
|- style="background:#fdd;"
|
| style="text-align:center;" |Loss
| Antonina Shevchenko	
| 
| Koh Samui Petch Booncha Stadium, Thailand
| style="text-align:center;" |Unanimous Decision
| align="center" |4
| align="center" |2:00
| style="text-align:center;" |
|-
|- style="background:#fdd;"
|
| style="text-align:center;" |Loss
| Eileen Forrest	
|Warriors at War
| Brisbane, Australia
| style="text-align:center;" |Decision
| align="center" |5
| align="center" |3:00
| style="text-align:center;" |
|-
! style=background:white colspan=9 |
|- style="background:#cfc;"
|
| style="text-align:center;"|Win
| Stephanie Ielö Page
| 
|  MBK, Bangkok, Thailand
| style="text-align:center;"|Unanimous Decision
|align=center|3
|align=center|3:00
| style="text-align:center;"|
|-
|-
! style=background:white colspan=9 |
|- style="background:#fdd;"
|
| style="text-align:center;" |Loss
|Julie Kitchen	
| 
| MBK Center, Bangkok, Thailand
| style="text-align:center;" |Unanimous Decision
| align="center" |5
| align="center" |3:00
| style="text-align:center;" |
|-
! style=background:white colspan=9 |
|- style="background:#cfc;"
|
| style="text-align:center;"|Win
| Lindsey Hofstrand
| 
| Patong Stadium, Phuket, Thailand
| style="text-align:center;"|
|align=center|3
|align=center|3:00
| style="text-align:center;"|
|- 
|- style="background:#cfc;"
|
| style="text-align:center;"|Win
| Namwan
| 
| Patong Stadium, Phuket, Thailand
| style="text-align:center;"|
|align=center|3
|align=center|3:00
| style="text-align:center;"|
|-
! style=background:white colspan=9 |
|- style="background:#cfc;"
|
| style="text-align:center;"|Win
| 
| 
| Patong Stadium, Phuket, Thailand
| style="text-align:center;"|
|align=center|3
|align=center|3:00
| style="text-align:center;"|
|-
|- style="background:#cfc;"
|
| style="text-align:center;"|Win
| Carly Giumulli
| 
| King's Birthday, Sanam Luang, Bangkok, Thailand
| style="text-align:center;"|
|align=center|3
|align=center|3:00
| style="text-align:center;"|
|-
! style=background:white colspan=9 |
|- style="background:#cfc;"
|
| style="text-align:center;"|Win
| Gulistan
| 
| WMF Prince's Cup, Bangkok, Thailand
| style="text-align:center;"|
|align=center|3
|align=center|3:00
| style="text-align:center;"|
|-
! style=background:white colspan=9 |
|- style="background:#cfc;"
|
| style="text-align:center;"|Win
| Zelda
| 
| WTKA World Championship, Italy
| style="text-align:center;"|
|align=center|3
|align=center|3:00
| style="text-align:center;"|
|-
! style=background:white colspan=9 |
|- style="background:#cfc;"
|
| style="text-align:center;"|Win
| Kelly
| 
| WTKA World Championships, Italy
| style="text-align:center;"|
|align=center|3
|align=center|3:00
| style="text-align:center;"|
|-
! style=background:white colspan=9 |
|- style="background:#cfc;"
|
| style="text-align:center;"|Win
| Nongnane Jorguun gym
| 
| Patong Stadium, Phuket, Thailand
| style="text-align:center;"|
|align=center|3
|align=center|3:00
| style="text-align:center;"|
|-
! style=background:white colspan=9 |
|- style="background:#cfc;"
|
| style="text-align:center;"|Win
| Surat Thani
| 
| Patong Stadium, Thailand
| style="text-align:center;"|
|align=center|3
|align=center|3:00
| style="text-align:center;"|
|-
|- style="background:#cfc;"
|
| style="text-align:center;"|Win
| 
| 
| WKA North American Championships, Virginia, USA
| style="text-align:center;"|
|align=center|3
|align=center|3:00
| style="text-align:center;"|
|-
! style=background:white colspan=9 |
|- style="background:#cfc;"
|
| style="text-align:center;"|Win
| Kwanfa
| 
| Kata Stadium, Phuket, Thailand
| style="text-align:center;"|
|align=center|3
|align=center|3:00
| style="text-align:center;"|
|-
|- style="background:#cfc;"
|
| style="text-align:center;"|Win
| Nonganne
| 
| Bangla Stadium, Phuket Thailand
| style="text-align:center;"|
|align=center|3
|align=center|3:00
| style="text-align:center;"|
|-
|- style="background:#cfc;"
|
| style="text-align:center;"|Win
| 
| 
| Lokroi Stadium, Chiang Mai, Thailand
| style="text-align:center;"|
|align=center|3
|align=center|3:00
| style="text-align:center;"|
|-
|-
| colspan=9 | Legend:

Professional Boxing Record

References

External links

 Chantal Ughi at Awakening Fighters

1981 births
Sportspeople from Milan
Actresses from Milan
Italian female kickboxers
Living people
Female Muay Thai practitioners
Italian women boxers